El Alamein is a 1953 American war film directed by Fred F. Sears and starring Scott Brady, Edward Ashley and Rita Moreno. Also known by the alternative title of Desert Patrol, it depicts the 1942 Battle of El Alamein during the North African Campaign. It was produced and distributed by Columbia Pictures with sets designed by the art director Edward L. Ilou.

Plot

Cast
 Scott Brady as Joe Banning  
 Edward Ashley as Capt. Harbison  
 Robin Hughes as Sgt. Alf Law  
 Rita Moreno as Jara  
 Michael Pate as Sgt. McQueen  
 Peter Brocco as Selim  
 Peter Mamakos as Cpl. Singh Das  
 Ray Page as Nazi Pilot  
 Benny Rubin as Egyptian Driver  
 Henry Rowland as Nazi Officer

References

Bibliography
 David Eldridge. Hollywood's History Films. B.Tauris, 2006.

External links
 

1953 films
1953 war films
American war films
Columbia Pictures films
Films directed by Fred F. Sears
North African campaign films
American black-and-white films
1950s English-language films
1950s American films